Paul J. Gillette (October 1, 1938 – January 6, 1996) was an American wine expert and writer. He was among the first to host a nationally syndicated television show on wine appreciation, Enjoying Wine with Paul Gillette. He was also known for writing Play Misty For Me, the novelization of a script by Jo Heims and Dean Reisner for the film of the same name starring Clint Eastwood.

Writings

Screenplays and novelizations
The Lopison Case (1967)
Play Misty for Me (1971) 
Cat o' Nine Tails (1972), filmed as The Cat o' Nine Tails
Carmela (1972)
One of the Crowd (1980)
The Chinese Godfather (1981)

Non-fiction
 Inside Ku Klux Klan (1965)
 Playboy's Book of Wine (1974)
 Enjoying Wine (1976)

Television
 Camera Three (as writer and occasional host)
 Enjoying Wine With Paul Gillette (PBS, 1974)

References

External links
 Paul Gillette papers, 1956–1990

Oenologists
1938 births
1996 deaths
Pennsylvania State University alumni
20th-century American male writers